Valter Külvet (19 February 1964 – 2 July 1998) was an Estonian athlete. He competed in the men's decathlon at the 1988 Summer Olympics, representing the Soviet Union. He died due to injuries received from a beating while being robbed. He won a gold medal at the 1983 European Athletics Junior Championships and a silver medal at the 1985 Summer Universiade.

References

1964 births
1998 deaths
People from Mulgi Parish
Estonian decathletes
Olympic athletes of the Soviet Union
Athletes (track and field) at the 1988 Summer Olympics
Deaths by beating in Europe
Universiade silver medalists for the Soviet Union
Universiade medalists in athletics (track and field)
Soviet decathletes